The third round of CAF matches for 2022 FIFA World Cup qualification was played from 25 to 29 March 2022. The ten group winners from the second round were drawn into five  ties. The five overall winners of these fixtures qualified for the 2022 FIFA World Cup.

Qualified teams

Draw and seeding
The draw for the third round was held on 22 January 2022 in Douala, Cameroon, starting at 16:00 (UTC+1). The seedings were based on the November 2021 FIFA World Rankings (shown in parentheses). Teams from Pot 2 hosted the first leg, while teams from Pot 1 hosted the second leg.

Note: Bolded teams qualified for the World Cup.

Summary

Matches

1–1 on aggregate. Senegal won 3–1 on penalties and qualified for the 2022 FIFA World Cup.

2–2 on aggregate. Cameroon won on away goals and qualified for the 2022 FIFA World Cup.

1–1 on aggregate. Ghana won on away goals and qualified for the 2022 FIFA World Cup.

Morocco won 5–2 on aggregate and qualified for the 2022 FIFA World Cup.

Tunisia won 1–0 on aggregate and qualified for the 2022 FIFA World Cup.

Goalscorers

References

External links

Qualifiers – Africa, FIFA.com

3
Qual
FIFA
Cameroon at the 2022 FIFA World Cup
Ghana at the 2022 FIFA World Cup
Morocco at the 2022 FIFA World Cup
Senegal at the 2022 FIFA World Cup
Tunisia at the 2022 FIFA World Cup